In eight-dimensional geometry, a rectified 8-orthoplex is a convex uniform 8-polytope, being a rectification of the regular 8-orthoplex.

There are unique 8 degrees of rectifications, the zeroth being the 8-orthoplex, and the 7th and last being the 8-cube. Vertices of the rectified 8-orthoplex are located at the edge-centers of the 8-orthoplex. Vertices of the birectified 8-orthoplex are located in the triangular face centers of the 8-orthoplex. Vertices of the trirectified 8-orthoplex are located in the tetrahedral cell centers of the 8-orthoplex.

Rectified 8-orthoplex 

The rectified 8-orthoplex has 112 vertices. These represent the root vectors of the simple Lie group D8. The vertices can be seen in 3 hyperplanes, with the 28 vertices rectified 7-simplexs cells on opposite sides, and 56 vertices of an expanded 7-simplex passing through the center. When combined with the 16 vertices of the 8-orthoplex, these vertices represent the 128 root vectors of the B8 and C8 simple Lie groups.

Related polytopes 

The rectified 8-orthoplex is the vertex figure for the demiocteractic honeycomb.
  or

Alternate names
 rectified octacross
 rectified diacosipentacontahexazetton (Acronym: rek) (Jonathan Bowers)

Construction 

There are two Coxeter groups associated with the rectified 8-orthoplex, one with the C8 or [4,36] Coxeter group, and a lower symmetry with two copies of heptcross facets, alternating, with the D8 or [35,1,1] Coxeter group.

Cartesian coordinates 
Cartesian coordinates for the vertices of a rectified 8-orthoplex, centered at the origin, edge length  are all permutations of:
 (±1,±1,0,0,0,0,0,0)

Images

Birectified 8-orthoplex

Alternate names
 birectified octacross
 birectified diacosipentacontahexazetton (Acronym: bark) (Jonathan Bowers)

Cartesian coordinates 
Cartesian coordinates for the vertices of a birectified 8-orthoplex, centered at the origin, edge length  are all permutations of:
 (±1,±1,±1,0,0,0,0,0)

Images

Trirectified 8-orthoplex

The trirectified 8-orthoplex can tessellate space in the quadrirectified 8-cubic honeycomb.

Alternate names
 trirectified octacross
 trirectified diacosipentacontahexazetton (acronym: tark) (Jonathan Bowers)

Cartesian coordinates 
Cartesian coordinates for the vertices of a trirectified 8-orthoplex, centered at the origin, edge length  are all permutations of:
 (±1,±1,±1,±1,0,0,0,0)

Images

Notes

References
 H.S.M. Coxeter: 
 H.S.M. Coxeter, Regular Polytopes, 3rd Edition, Dover New York, 1973 
 Kaleidoscopes: Selected Writings of H.S.M. Coxeter, edited by F. Arthur Sherk, Peter McMullen, Anthony C. Thompson, Asia Ivic Weiss, Wiley-Interscience Publication, 1995,  
 (Paper 22) H.S.M. Coxeter, Regular and Semi Regular Polytopes I, [Math. Zeit. 46 (1940) 380-407, MR 2,10]
 (Paper 23) H.S.M. Coxeter, Regular and Semi-Regular Polytopes II, [Math. Zeit. 188 (1985) 559-591]
 (Paper 24) H.S.M. Coxeter, Regular and Semi-Regular Polytopes III, [Math. Zeit. 200 (1988) 3-45]
 Norman Johnson Uniform Polytopes, Manuscript (1991)
 N.W. Johnson: The Theory of Uniform Polytopes and Honeycombs, Ph.D. 
  o3x3o3o3o3o3o4o - rek, o3o3x3o3o3o3o4o - bark, o3o3o3x3o3o3o4o - tark

External links 
 Polytopes of Various Dimensions
 Multi-dimensional Glossary

8-polytopes